Chicago News Service is a broadcast news agency that provides Electronic news-gathering (ENG) services to domestic and international television networks. The agency also provides consultancy services to international networks assisting in setting up news bureauss in Chicago.  

Chicago News Service, under its production division Skyline Media, has provided news coverage from important news events around the Midwest including President Barack Obama's election night celebration from Millennium Park on November 5, 2008.  The agency has also provides breaking news coverage including video. The agency while catering primarily to major television networks also maintains a local news division that captures local content and creates video archives.

Television clients
Television news production services are contracted by the following networks:
 Associated Press
 CCTV (China)

External links
thatsnews.tv
productionhub.com
jameschambers.org
YouTube
policeone.com
News agencies based in the United States